White Gold is a 1927 American silent Western film produced and distributed by Cecil B. DeMille and directed by William K. Howard.

Cast
 Jetta Goudal as Dolores Carson
 Kenneth Thomson as Alec Carson
 George Bancroft as Sam Randall
 George Nichols as Carson, Alec's Father
 Bob Perry as Bucky O'Neill (billed as Robert Perry)
 Clyde Cook as Homer

Critical reception
Mordaunt Hall of The New York Times described the film as an "interesting production" that also had "marked simplicity" in terms of its story. Hall also said that "but for some repetitions, a few accentuated actions and instances of forced comedy, [it] would be one of the really great productions." The Ottawa Citizen said that, because of a new scripting technique employed by William Howard, "the film more closely approaches realism than anything ever before attempted in motion pictures." Philip K. Scheuer of the Los Angeles Times called it a "distinguished film" that employed the suggestion of sound by showing "creaking rockers, ticking clocks, the click of poker chips".

Bibliography

References

External links
 

1927 films
1927 Western (genre) films
American black-and-white films
Films directed by William K. Howard
Producers Distributing Corporation films
Silent American Western (genre) films
Films with screenplays by Garrett Fort
1920s American films
1920s English-language films